Soltanmuradlı (also, Soltanmuradly) is a village and municipality in the Imishli Rayon of Azerbaijan.  It has a population of 876.

References 

Populated places in Imishli District